Griselda is a feminine given name.

Griselda may also refer to:

Operas
 Griselda (Antonio Maria Bononcini), a 1718 opera by Antonio Maria Bononcini
 Griselda (Giovanni Bononcini), a 1722 opera by Giovanni Bononcini
 Griselda (A. Scarlatti), a 1721 opera by Alessandro Scarlatti
 Griselda, a 1725 opera by Francesco Conti
 Griselda (Vivaldi), a 1735 opera by Antonio Vivaldi

Other uses
 Griselda Records, American hip hop collective and record label
 "Griselda", a song from the 1976 album Have Moicy! by Peter Stampfel
 Griselda Marchbanks, a character in J. K. Rowling's Harry Potter books
 Griselda (miniseries), a Netflix show based on the life of Griselda Blanco